"Wedding Day at Troldhaugen" (Norwegian: "") is a composition for piano by Edvard Grieg. It is the sixth piano piece in the eighth book of his Lyric Pieces, bearing the opus number 65.

Description
Originally called "" (The well-wishers are coming), it was written in 1896 as a memorial of the 25th wedding anniversary of Grieg and his wife Nina. The anniversary celebration had been held in the Fossli Hotel near the Vøringfossen waterfall in June 1896. Grieg and his wife celebrated their wedding anniversary with Børre and Nancy Giertsen. Nancy was the sister of Marie Beyer, then married to Frants Beyer, Grieg's best friend. She belonged to their closest circle of friends at Troldhaugen. During the occasion a guest book was ready to take contributions from all the guests.

Grieg gave the work its final title in 1897 when he compiled Book VIII, Op. 65, of his Lyric Pieces. The work's festive march-like first section, describes congratulations and best wishes that are given by the guests to the newly-weds; the second section is reflective and subdued. Most performances of this piece take about 5 to 6 minutes.

References

Attribution
This article is based on the translation of the corresponding article of the Norwegian Wikipedia. A list of contributors can be found there at the History section.

External links

, 

1897 compositions
Compositions for solo piano
Compositions by Edvard Grieg
Wedding music